Chhanbey is a constituency of the Uttar Pradesh Legislative Assembly covering the city of Chhanbey in the Mirzapur district of Uttar Pradesh, India.

Chhanbey is one of five assembly constituencies in the Mirzapur Lok Sabha constituency. Since 2008, this assembly constituency is numbered 395 amongst 403 constituencies.

Election results

2022

2017
Apna Dal (Sonelal) candidate Rahul Prakash won in 2017 Uttar Pradesh Legislative Elections defeating Bahujan Samaj Party candidate Dhaneswar by a margin of 63,468 votes.

References

External links
 

Assembly constituencies of Uttar Pradesh
Mirzapur district